Mario Lambrughi (born 5 February 1992) is an Italian male hurdler. In 2018, establishing his Personal Best with 48.99, at 13 May 2018 had reached the 1st place in the seasonal European lists.

Personal best
400 metres hurdles: 48.99 -  Rieti, 13 May 2018

National titles
 Italian Athletics Championships
 400 metres hurdles: 2019, 2022

See also
 Italian all-time lists - 400 metres hurdles

References

External links

1992 births
Living people
Italian male hurdlers
Athletics competitors of Centro Sportivo Carabinieri
Italian Athletics Championships winners
Athletes (track and field) at the 2022 Mediterranean Games
Mediterranean Games competitors for Italy